The iMac G4 is an all-in-one personal computer designed, manufactured, and sold by Apple Computer from January 2002 to August 2004.  It replaced the iMac G3 and was succeeded by the iMac G5.

Design and marketing 

The iMac G4 featured an LCD mounted on an adjustable arm above a hemisphere containing a full-size, tray-loading optical drive and a fourth-generation PowerPC G4 74xx-series processor. The internals such as the hard drive and motherboard were placed in the "dome" instead of the LCD panel as it would be too heavy. The arm allowed the display to hold almost any angle around the dome-shaped bottom. The iMac G4 was sold only in white, and was not translucent like the iMac G3. The machine was sold with the ice-white Apple Pro Keyboard and Apple Pro Mouse, which were later redesigned and renamed the Apple Keyboard and Apple Mouse, respectively. Optional Apple Pro Speakers, which were better quality than the internal speakers, were also available. The Apple Pro Speakers used a unique adapter, designed to work only with a select few Apple Macintosh models.

The iMac G4 originally included both Mac OS 9 and Mac OS X, due to the machine being released in the year Mac OS 9 was discontinued. When running newer versions of Mac OS X (Tiger and Leopard), the iMac G4's GeForce4 MX GPU was not capable of Core Image rendering. This causes some minor graphical issues. One such issue would be the lack of the Dashboard ripple effect when a widget is introduced. Another would be an opaque menu bar in Mac OS X Leopard.

It was originally known as the New iMac, while the existing iMac G3 continued to be sold for several months. During this time, Apple had all but eliminated CRT displays from its product line. However, the LCD iMacs were unable to match the low price point of the iMac G3, largely due to the higher cost of the LCD technology at the time. The iMac G3 was obsolete by this point, but low-cost machines were particularly important for the education market. Because of this affordability issue, Apple created the eMac in April 2002 and ended production of the iMac G3. The iMac G4 was then marketed as the "iMac" until its discontinuation, then was retroactively labeled iMac G4 to distinguish itself from the succeeding iMac G5 in August 2004.

Apple advertised the iMac G4 as having the adjustability of a desk lamp. One of the advertisements for the machine featured it sitting in a store window "reacting" to every move made by a passer-by on the street. At the end, when the man sticks out his tongue, the iMac responds by opening its optical drive.

The internal components are housed in a 10.6" half-sphere, ice white case with a chromed stainless steel neck that supports a 15" TFT active matrix LCD display. Unlike some earlier iMac models that are convection-cooled, the iMac "Flat Panel" series is cooled by a quiet internal fan. The original model from 2002 shipped with Mac OS X 10.1 and Mac OS 9.2.2 preinstalled with Mac OS X selected as the default OS.

The Gateway Profile was one of the few Wintel competitors to the iMac G4 in the all-in-one LCD computer market. A reviewer noted that the Profile had better processing power, due to its Intel Pentium 4, whereas the iMac was hampered because its G4 chip lacked the 1 MB L2 cache found on the higher-end Power Mac. The iMac had clear advantages in LCD screen quality (it uses a digital LCD as opposed to an analog LCD), ergonomics (particularly the flexible monitor arm), and multimedia. The reviewer concluded that the iMac worked well as an introduction to the Macintosh ecosystem, but noted that their relatively high prices were approaching that of laptops, which were portable and had higher resolution LCD screens.

Specifications

Timeline of iMac models

References

External links 

 Apple Support Page
 Profile: 15" iMac G4/700, 800
 Video of Jobs launching the iMac G4 at Macworld 2002 (starts at 59 minutes)
 Overclocking guide for the Apple iMac G4 main logic board

G4
Macintosh all-in-ones
PowerPC Macintosh computers
Computer-related introductions in 2002